Canek was the name of a Mayan chiefdom of the Yucatán Peninsula, before the arrival of the Spanish conquistadors in the sixteenth century.

See also
Kan Ek'

References

Mayan chiefdoms of the Yucatán Peninsula